The 1989 Boston College Eagles football team represented Boston College as an independent during the 1989 NCAA Division I-A football season. The Eagles were led by ninth-year head coach Jack Bicknell, and played their home games at Alumni Stadium in Chestnut Hill, Massachusetts. Their 2–9 final record represented the fourth consecutive year of declining results for the Eagles, and their worst record in 11 years.

Schedule

Personnel

Season summary

Pittsburgh

at Rutgers

at Penn State

at Ohio State

Temple

Navy

West Virginia

at Syracuse

at Army

Louisville

at Georgia Tech

References

Boston College
Boston College Eagles football seasons
Boston College Eagles football
Boston College Eagles football